Yohann Tihoni (born 20 July 1994) is a soccer player from Tahiti currently playing for AS Roniu and for the Tahiti national football team.
He was part of the Tahitian squad at the 2013 FIFA Confederations Cup in Brazil.

References

External links
FIFA Profile

1994 births
Living people
French Polynesian footballers
Tahiti international footballers
2013 FIFA Confederations Cup players
Association football midfielders